The Medic is a 1916 Hungarian film directed by Michael Curtiz.

Plot summary

Cast
 Victor Varconi as János, medikus (as Várkonyi Mihály)
 Ferenc Hegedüs as János apja, szabó
 Leontine Kühnberg as õris Piros, vidéki lány
 Lajos Réthey as Professzor
 Rózsi Forgách as A professzor lánya
 Lajos Kemenes as Kispap / festõ
 Lucy Doraine as A szabó lánya (as Kovács Ilonka)
 Alfréd Deésy as Miniszter
 Izsó Gyöngyi as Vállakozó
 Béla Bodonyi as Hirschy
 Dezsõ Pártos
 László Tesséky
 Michael Curtiz

References

External links
 
 

Films directed by Michael Curtiz
Hungarian black-and-white films
Hungarian silent films
1916 Austro-Hungarian films